Erins Isle (foaled 1978 in Ireland) was a Thoroughbred racehorse who competed successfully in Ireland and the United States. While racing in Ireland in 1981 for trainer Jim Bolger, Erins Isle was originally owned by Hugh Mc Caffrey and sold to a syndicate headed by Brian Sweeney of Dublin. In 1982, Erins Isle was sent to the United States where he raced from a base in California for U. S. Racing Hall of Fame trainer, Charlie Whittingham.

In 1983, Erins Isle was a candidate for an Eclipse Award following a year in which he competed with the best turf horses in the United States and notably won the Grade I Hollywood Invitational Turf Handicap.

Retired after the 1983 racing season, Erins Isle stood at stud, meeting with some success as a sire. Among his offspring, in 1990 daughter Laugh And Be Merry won the Grade I Flower Bowl Invitational Handicap and son Rowdy Irishman won the 1997 Breeders' Cup Steeplechase. Erins Isle was also the damsire of Soldier of Fortune whose wins included the 2008 Irish Derby Stakes and Coronation Cup. His daughter Erin's Irish Lass, is the grand dam of Affluent.

References
 Erins Isle's pedigree and partial racing stats
 May 17, 1982 New York Times article titled "Erins Isle Wins The Californian"
 May 23, 1983 St. Petersburg Times article titled "''Erins Isle Wins By Head in Hollywood Invitational

1978 racehorse births
Racehorses bred in Ireland
Racehorses trained in Ireland
Racehorses trained in the United States
American Grade 1 Stakes winners
Thoroughbred family 2-n